Kleiner is a German and Jewish surname, meaning "smaller":

 Alfred Kleiner, Swiss physicist
 Bruce Kleiner, American mathematician
 Krista Arrieta Kleiner, Filipino-American TV actress/singer and host 
 Dick Kleiner, Hollywood columnist
 Eugene Kleiner, Silicon Valley venture capitalist
 Eugène-Louis Kleiner, Roman Catholic bishop
Israel Kleiner (biochemist) (1885-1966), biochemist
Israel Kleiner (mathematician), Canadian mathematician, professor at McGill University
 John J. Kleiner, US Congressman from Indiana
 Michael Kleiner, Israeli politician
 Morris Kleiner, American professor of public affairs
Gastón Kleiner, Argentine musician
 Sergio Kleiner, Argentine soap opera star
 Yosef Kleiner, rabbi, psychologist, actor and intellectual

Fictional characters 
 Isaac Kleiner, from the video games Half-Life and Half-Life 2.

Other meanings 
 Kleiner Feldberg, mountain in Germany
 Kleiner Perkins Caufield & Byers, venture capital firm
 Kleiner Semmering Pass, mountain pass in Austria
 Kleiner Münsterländer, hunting-pointing-retrieving dog breed

German-language surnames
Jewish surnames
Yiddish-language surnames